Resurs-P No.2 is a Russian commercial Earth observation satellite capable of acquiring high-resolution imagery (resolution up to 1.0 m). The spacecraft will be operated by Roscosmos along with the Resurs-P No.1 satellite.

The satellite is designed for multi-spectral remote sensing of the Earth's surface aimed at acquiring high-quality visible images in near real-time as well as on-line data delivery via radio link and providing a wide range of consumers with value-added processed data.

Additionally the satellite carries the Nuklon high-energy particle detector developed by the Moscow State University for detecting cosmic radiation.

See also

 2014 in spaceflight
 Resurs-P

References

External links
 Roscosmos official website 
 Resurs-P remote sensing satellite - RussianSpaceWeb.com

Reconnaissance satellites of Russia
Spacecraft launched by Soyuz-2 rockets
Spacecraft launched in 2014